...And Then There Were Three... (stylised in all lowercase) is the ninth studio album by the English rock band Genesis. It was released in March 1978 by Charisma Records and is their first recorded as a trio of singer/drummer Phil Collins, keyboardist Tony Banks, and bassist/guitarist Mike Rutherford following the departure of guitarist Steve Hackett. The album marked a change in the band's sound, mixing elements of their progressive rock roots with more accessible material, and Collins contributing to more of the group's songwriting.

The album was certified platinum by the Recording Industry Association of America (RIAA) in 1988 for selling one million copies in the US. To further promote it, Genesis toured worldwide with live guitarist Daryl Stuermer and drummer Chester Thompson, both of whom would become mainstays of the band's touring lineup for the next three decades. The album was remixed in 2007 as part of the Genesis 1976–1982 box set in 5.1 surround sound and a new stereo mix by Nick Davis.

Production

Background 
In July 1977, the Genesis line-up of drummer and vocalist Phil Collins, keyboardist Tony Banks, bassist Mike Rutherford, guitarist Steve Hackett, and touring drummer Chester Thompson completed their tour in support of their eighth studio album, Wind & Wuthering. The band proceeded to edit and mix their second live album, Seconds Out, in August 1977, during which time Hackett temporarily left the band to pursue a solo career. In 1975, he released a successful solo album, Voyage of the Acolyte, featuring several members of Genesis. Increasingly frustrated by the band's disinterest in his ideas, he decided to leave the group. By 1979, the remaining members of Genesis had already begun work on their own solo albums. Since Genesis had now played Madison Square Garden, Hackett felt the group had reached its pinnacle and thus he had no reason to continue performing with them. His departure was not made public until October 8th, when Collins, Banks, and Rutherford were promoting Seconds Out (and had finished working on their ninth album as Genesis, titled ...And Then There Were Three...). The trio were confident they could carry on, as they had formed the backbone of several Genesis classics, including the "Apocalypse in 9/8" section of "Supper's Ready", the instrumental part of "The Cinema Show" and the basics of A Trick of the Tail (written while Hackett was working on his first solo album). They also agreed not to hire a replacement for Hackett, choosing instead to perform all instrumental work on their albums themselves going forward.

Writing and recording 

Rehearsals began at Shepperton Studios for around six weeks. In September 1977, the remaining three members returned to Relight Studios in Hilvarenbeek, Netherlands to write and record their new album, the same venue as used for the Wind & Wuthering album. The group wished to record in a new location, but they could not find a studio that fit their needs and did not wish to travel too far from England. Rutherford wished to remain in London, but noted recording abroad was their "one tax concession". Joining the group was audio engineer and co-producer David Hentschel who had worked on the band's past two albums. Genesis also shared production duties and are credited on the album's sleeve. According to Rutherford, the material was recorded in two weeks. The band considered auditioning new guitarists or utilising a studio guitarist for the album, but Rutherford felt confident enough in his skills to take on the lead guitar parts himself, feeling he would enjoy the challenge of doing so. Banks noticed recording as a three-member band was an easier and more pleasurable experience than before as each member had a clearly defined role, which reduced the risk of personnel clashes along the way. Rutherford became aware that with three members, the basic tracks came across as sparse and not so easy to understand until the overdubs were recorded on top of them. Following the recording, the group mixed the album at Trident Studios in London.

Banks and Rutherford remained the more dominant songwriters with four and three songs written by them respectively, one from Banks and Collins, and three tracks written by all three members. Collins had settled down with his wife and two children in South Ealing, meaning he did not find much time to bring new compositions to the sessions. Rutherford later said he was impressed the group wrote "Follow You Follow Me", as they had had difficulty writing songs that worked within a 3–4 minute framework. The majority of the album was formed of pre-written songs, not ones developed from jams and improvisations. Collins later thought the album lacked "rich, jazzy pieces" like "Los Endos" from A Trick of the Tail with its merge of rhythm and melody, but could not contribute such ideas as it was difficult to play the drums in his flat in Ealing with his wife and two children. The group were still growing in popularity in the United States and did not have a hit single, which Banks later admitted was a struggling point for them. The original album track order swapped "Undertow" with "Many Too Many" and "Scenes from a Night's Dream", before it was changed as the band felt it flowed better.

Sleeve design 
As with their past three studio albums, the album cover and packaging was designed by Storm Thorgerson and Aubrey Powell of Hipgnosis. Thorgerson later said the cover was "trying to tell a story by the traces left by the light trails". The photograph was shot using time-lapse to represent the "comings and goings" in the album's lyrics, and over the change in personnel.

Composition
The album marked a change in the band's sound, moving from their progressive rock roots towards shorter, more concise songs. The motivation for this was to enable more musical ideas to be put on a single album, and to act as a response to the newly-emerging punk rock and new wave scenes, where short and concise songs were standard. Collins recognized how this decision gave off the impression that Genesis was aiming to become "a singles band" that prioritized commercial success over artistic credibility, but maintained that the new material remained "fundamentally the same". Rutherford in particular wanted to forge his own style and not copy Hackett's distinctive guitar tones, so the album was more dominated by Banks' keyboards, with sparser and simpler guitar parts.

Side one 
"Down and Out", one of the three tracks written collectively, was created during the band's rehearsals. Thompson found its more complex time signature difficult to reproduce on stage at first as Collins could not explain the riff and rhythm which Rutherford noted merely "added to the confusion". Collins wrote the lyrics, which concern American record labels who drop artists when they are no longer in fashion; the chorus is spoken from the artists's view and the verses from the label. The band had originally planned to develop and arrange Banks's song "Undertow" further, but its basic track of guitar, drums and piano, coupled with its simple chorus, was strong enough to keep as it was. Banks plays a Yamaha electric grand piano on the track which also incorporates voice loops made by the band that were kept "low-key and subtle" in the final mix. Banks had written a two-minute introduction to the song, but recalled disagreement from the other members as there were enough keyboard parts on the album. The section was reworked and used as a part of "From the Undertow", a track on Banks's first solo album A Curious Feeling (1979).

The lyrics to "Ballad of Big" were written by Collins. The introduction contains a wobbly guitar effect created by Rutherford whereby he rubbed his guitar strings with pieces of metal, giving it a "slightly Eastern strain". The end of the track has Banks and himself duelling between the Yamaha electric piano and his Roland guitar synthesiser. For "Snowbound", Collins originally recorded his drum part at a considerably faster pace before the group decided to slow them down in order to fit the style of the song. Collins and Rutherford described it as a romantic song, with its lyrics about a man who wears a snowman outfit to hide from people but while inside, becomes paranoid and finds he cannot get out. While Banks was writing "Burning Rope", he decided to shorten the track rather than stretch its arrangements into an extended piece as he wished to avoid repeating himself and drawing comparisons to his ten-minute "One for the Vine" from Wind & Wuthering. It features a lead guitar solo from Rutherford that he found was a challenge to produce in the wake of Hackett's departure, but was pleased with the final result and called it his best on the album.

Side two 
The original title to "Deep in the Motherlode" was "Heavy". Rutherford uses a bottleneck slide guitar which he was inexperienced with at first to the point of placing it "on the wrong hand". "Many Too Many" features more lead guitar work from Rutherford, who felt less confident about his playing compared to the months after the album's release and had practised further. Once the basic tracks had been put down, the group were still unsure on how to finish the song and sought more arrangements to complete it, including a string sound Banks played on a Polymoog. At one point, they considered using orchestral instruments for the track but they never tried it. Banks, who penned the song's lyrics, recalled an issue Collins had with singing the word "mama" in the chorus; Banks had to reassure him that he could sing it. "Scenes from a Night's Dream" is based on a childhood dream, itself inspired by the cartoon strip character Little Nemo which Collins had bought a book on for his brother. The song developed from a musical idea from Banks who wrote the first draft of its lyrics, but he gave up halfway through as he felt they were unsuitable. The band instead settled on a set of lyrics that Collins offered during down time while mixing at Trident Studios that brought in a different melody and more harmonies.

"Say It's Alright Joe", written by Rutherford and the penultimate track recorded for the album, is a torch song about an alcoholic who goes into a drunken stupor. The guitarist intended the track to be a "piss-take on the Dean Martin 'set 'em up Joe' alcoholic style'", but thought it was not going to work until Banks added his keyboard overdubs and the band started mixing the track, at which point it "came to life". The introduction to "The Lady Lies" was meant to have a "strippers feel to it. Hence the title". Genesis deliberately planned to close the album on a "lighter note" as a contrast to a heavier track, so they placed "Follow You Follow Me" at the end, the album's only track written during the rehearsal stage and went through numerous guises before the group settled on a three-minute song. Hentschel was dismissive of the song, but prepared an initial mix and presented it to the staff at Atlantic Records, who recognised it as a potential hit single for the band. The song was remixed and included on the album. The lyrics were written by Rutherford and were inspired by his wife. He later said it was the easiest set of lyrics he had written, spending "about ten minutes" on it.

Release 
...And Then There Were Three... was released in the UK on 31 March 1978 and in the US on 28 March on Atlantic Records. The album continued to sell, and was certified gold by the Recording Industry Association of America on 31 May 1978 for 500,000 copies sold in the US. It reached platinum status on 11 February 1988 for selling one million copies. The album was considered a commercial breakthrough for Genesis, as it brought in sufficiently large audiences to be able to make a profit from touring, which before then had always run at a loss.

Genesis released two singles from ...And Then There Were Three....

Reissues 
A digitally remastered version was released on CD in 1994 on Virgin in Europe and Atlantic in the US and Canada. A SACD / DVD double disc set (including new 5.1 and Stereo mixes) was released on 2 April 2007. It was released in the US and Canada as part of the Genesis 1976–1982 box set. This includes the album in remixed stereo and surround sound, and related video tracks. The only exception is the track "Say It's Alright Joe", which was not remixed because the band was unable to locate the multitrack recordings.

Critical reception 

In an April 1978 review for Melody Maker, reporter Chris Welch praised the album as "strong, confident" that is "as good as any they have made in the band's post-Gabriel years". Welch noted the songs have "a sense of purpose" and come with "a remarkably powerful sound", and picked "Ballad of Big" as his favourite track. A review in The Town Talk praised the group for filling the gap Hackett left "confidently" and picks "Down and Out" as claim of their survival. The rest of the album is "a tapestry of imaginary landscapes filled with the struggling mythic heroes that Genesis has learned to depict so well". Gary Mullinax for The Morning News thought the album sounded little different to Wind & Wuthering and noted the dominance of Banks's keyboards over Rutherford's guitars, with "the same dreamy wall-of-sound music with the same high-pitched vocals" from Collins. He concluded that Genesis succeed at points on the album but thought many songs on it fail to go anywhere, "blending into one another like some sort of hip musak". Charley Walters, writing in Circus, said that despite the exits of Gabriel and Hackett, Genesis have sacrificed "neither direction nor quality". The album, he thought, has "hard, almost ominous" tracks like "Down and Out" and "softer, more melodic" ones like "Say It's Alright Joe", all of which create "a magical, mystical sound that sets them apart from the numerous similar but usually inferior European art-rock ensembles". He names Banks as the one of the trio most responsible for their sound with his "rich" arrangements complemented by Rutherford's restrained guitar work which is "more felt than heard" which worked well to his praise on "Burning Rope". Walters, however, thought Collins's vocals has shortcomings that lacks expansion or breathtaking moments, though is a drummer who can still be melodic.

Other reviewers were more critical of the album, including Jon Pareles and Village Voice critic Robert Christgau, who said that "without lead guitarist Steve Hackett, the band loses its last remaining focal point; the rest is double-tracking. Hence a sound as mushy as the dread Moody Blues, with fewer excuses." In Crawdaddy, Michael Bloom found Banks's sounding arrangements and keyboard sounds poor, saying they tend to "practically vanish" and "slip through your fingers". He also declared Rutherford's lead guitar playing as "unbearably clumsy" compared to Hackett but remains a "rare bassist" whose 12-string guitar playing reminded the reviewer of Rutherford on Trespass (1970) and the surrounding period in the band's history. Bloom picked out "The Lady Lies" as Banks's strongest contribution both musically and lyrically, comparing the composition and lyrical message to "One for the Vine" on Wind & Wuthering, and also highlighted "Deep in the Motherlode" as a strong track, but found Collins's singing "uniformly insipid" and concluded that the album is "less of a disappointment than an interminable frustration". In his review for Rolling Stone, he said Hackett's "wonderful orchestral guitar playing, which once governed his subtle use of effects, has unfortunately evaporated in the baldness of his new material", while concluding that "this contemptible opus is but the palest shadow of the group's earlier accomplishments."

Retrospective appraisals have also been mixed. In The Rolling Stone Album Guide, J. D. Considine deemed it "a genuine pop breakthrough" that "does hone the playing so that there's less empty flash and wasted energy", while MusicHound Rock (1996) said it "put Genesis on the radio with 'Follow You, Follow Me' but lacked the meaty songcraft and ambitious arrangements of its predecessors".

Tour 
Genesis embarked on the ...And Then There Were Three... Tour between March and December 1978, including nearly 100 shows covering Europe, the US and Japan, with only a single UK show at Knebworth Park on 24 June. The US dates were important as they would allow the band to recoup touring costs, which were running at around $25,000 a day.

The group needed an additional touring member to cover all the material, but Rutherford only wanted to play lead guitar on the new songs from ...And Then There Were Three... and return to bass and twelve-string for everything else. The successful applicant would have to play bass on the new material and cover Hackett's old lead parts. They first approached Weather Report's Alphonso Johnson, but he was primarily a bassist and his style did not fit in with the rest of the band. Johnson suggested instead that they consider jazz-fusion guitarist Daryl Stuermer, who was already a Genesis fan. He tried out an audition in New York, playing bass on "Down and Out" and lead guitar on "Squonk" from 1976's A Trick of the Tail and was immediately hired. "The Fountain of Salmacis", the closing track from 1971's Nursery Cryme was reintroduced into the live set, so Stuermer could take a song with a distinctive Hackett solo and put his own stamp on it. "Say It's Alright Joe" was performed with Collins in character wearing a raincoat and using Banks' keyboards as a makeshift bar.

The tour had several breaks so the band could have time with their family at home. Collins later said the tour was "an end of an era" and thought the group did not need to play live as much in the future. The tour was a major factor in Collins' divorce from his first wife, as she felt he was away from home too often and needed support at home. A row with his wife cancelled plans for her and their children to join Collins on the Japanese leg, and Collins recalled: "I went to Japan, and spent ten days drunk. I hated every minute of it. I couldn't sing and everyone was concerned about my welfare although there was nothing anyone could do about it."

Track listing 
All songs arranged and performed by Genesis.

Additional tracks

Additional songs recorded during the …And Then There Were Three… sessions can be found on other releases:

Personnel 
Credits are adapted from the album's 1978 and 2007 liner notes.

Genesis
 Tony Banks – keyboards
 Phil Collins – drums, vocals
 Mike Rutherford – basses, guitars

Production
 Genesis – production
 David Hentschel – production, engineer
 Pierre Geofroy Chateau – production assistant
 Steve Short – mixing assistant
 Geoff Banks – equipment
 Andy Mackrill – equipment
 Dale Newman – equipment
 Hipgnosis – sleeve design, photographs

Charts

Weekly charts

Year-end charts

Certifications

References 
Citations

Books

DVD media

Genesis (band) albums
1978 albums
Charisma Records albums
Albums with cover art by Hipgnosis
Albums produced by David Hentschel
Albums produced by Phil Collins
Albums produced by Tony Banks (musician)
Albums produced by Mike Rutherford
Virgin Records albums
Atlantic Records albums
Albums recorded at Trident Studios